Modibo Keita (31 July 1942 – 2 January 2021) was a Malian politician who was Prime Minister of Mali from 18 March 2002 to 8 June 2002 and from 9 January 2015 to 9 April 2017.

As Prime Minister for less than three months in 2002, he was the final prime minister appointed by President Alpha Oumar Konaré.

In April 2014, he was appointed as President Ibrahim Boubacar Keita's chief representative for negotiations with rebels. President Keita subsequently appointed him to succeed Moussa Mara as Prime Minister on 8 January 2015. He was a relative of both President Keita and founding father Modibo Keïta, his namesake, as a descendant of the Keita princes of the Empire of Mali. On 7 April 2017, he tendered his resignation as prime minister.

Keita died on 2 January 2021, at the age of 78.

References

"Les anciens ministres du Mali démocratique : qu’est ce qu’ils deviennent ?", Nouvel Observateur, 19 September 2008 

|-

1942 births
2021 deaths
Alliance for Democracy in Mali politicians
People from Koulikoro Region
Prime Ministers of Mali
21st-century Malian people